The 13th congressional district of Ohio is represented by Representative Emilia Sykes. Due to reapportionment following the 2010 United States Census, Ohio lost its 17th and 18th congressional districts, necessitating redrawing of district lines. Following the 2012 elections, the 13th district changed to take in much of the territory in the former 17th district, including the city of Youngstown and areas east of Akron.

It was one of several districts challenged in a 2018 lawsuit seeking to overturn Ohio's congressional map as an unconstitutional gerrymander.  According to the lawsuit, the 13th resembles a "jigsaw puzzle piece" that reaches out to grab the portion of Akron not taken in by the Cleveland-based 11th district.

From 2003 to 2013, the district ran from Lorain to include part of Akron, also taking in the suburban areas in between.

In the 2020 redistricting cycle, Ohio lost its 16th congressional district and this district was redrawn to include all of Summit County and parts of Stark and Portage County including Canton, North Canton and parts of Massillon, while Youngstown was removed from the district.

List of members representing the district

Recent election results
The following chart shows historic election results since 1920.

{| class=wikitable

|-
! Year
! Democratic
! Republican
! Other

|-
| 1920
| Alfred Waggoner: 26,646
|  James T. Begg (Incumbent): 48,416
|  

|-
| 1922
| Arthur W. Overmyer: 30,199
|  James T. Begg (Incumbent): 38,994
|  

|-
| 1924
| John Dreitzler: 27,623
|  James T. Begg (Incumbent): 45,307
|  

|-
| 1926
| G. C. Steineman: 19,571
|  James T. Begg (Incumbent): 36,444
|  

|-
| 1928
| William C. Martin: 34,015
|  Joe E. Baird: 54,174
|  

|-
| 1930
|  William L. Fiesinger: 35,199
| Joe E. Baird (Incumbent): 35,199
|  

|-
| 1932
|  William L. Fiesinger (Incumbent): 56,070
| Walter E. Kruger: 39,122
|  

|-
| 1934
|  William L. Fiesinger (Incumbent): 43,617
| Walter E. Kruger: 35,889
| Charles C. Few: 764

|-
| 1936
| Forrest R. Black: 39,042
|  Dudley A. White: 46,623
| Merrell E. Martin: 12,959

|-
| 1938
| William L. Fiesinger: 24,749
|  Dudley A. White (Incumbent): 56,204
|  

|-
| 1940
| Werner S. Haslinger: 40,274
|  A. David Baumhart Jr.: 62,442
|  

|-
| 1942
| E. C. Alexander: 23,618
|  Alvin F. Weichel: 37,923
|  

|-
| 1944
|  
|  Alvin F. Weichel (Incumbent): 67,298
|  

|-
| 1946
| Frank W. Thomas: 19,237
|  Alvin F. Weichel (Incumbent): 49,725
|  

|-
| 1948
| Dwight A. Blackmore: 38,264
|  Alvin F. Weichel (Incumbent): 55,408
|  

|-
| 1950
| Dwight A. Blackmore: 24,042
|  Alvin F. Weichel (Incumbent): 58,484
|  

|-
| 1952
| George C. Steinemann: 44,467
|  Alvin F. Weichel (Incumbent): 63,344
|  

|-
| 1954
| George C. Steinemann: 32,177
|  A. David Baumhart Jr.: 56,524
|  

|-
| 1956
| J. P. Henderson: 32,900
|  A. David Baumhart Jr. (Incumbent): 79,324
|  

|-
| 1958
| J. William McCray: 45,390
|  A. David Baumhart Jr. (Incumbent): 65,169
|  

|-
| 1960
| J. William McCray: 69,033
|  Charles A. Mosher: 73,100
|  

|-
| 1962
| J. Grant Keys: 52,030
|  Charles A. Mosher (Incumbent): 63,858
|  

|-
| 1964
| Louis Frey: 62,780
|  Charles A. Mosher (Incumbent): 75,945
|  

|-
| 1966
| Thomas E. Wolfe: 36,751
|  Charles A. Mosher (Incumbent): 69,862
|  

|-
| 1968
| Adrian F. Betleski: 59,864
|  Charles A. Mosher (Incumbent): 97,158
|  

|-
| 1970
| Joseph J. Bartolomeo: 53,271
|  Charles A. Mosher (Incumbent): 85,858
|  

|-
| 1972
| John M. Ryan: 51,991
|  Charles A. Mosher (Incumbent): 111,242
|  

|-
| 1974
| Fred M. Ritenauer: 53,766
|  Charles A. Mosher (Incumbent): 72,881
|  

|-
| 1976
|  Don Pease: 108,061
| Woodrow W. Mathna: 49,828
| Patricia A. Cortez: 5,794

|-
| 1978
|  Don Pease (Incumbent): 80,875
| Mark W. Whitfield: 43,269
|  

|-
| 1980
|  Don Pease (Incumbent): 113,439
| David Earl Armstrong: 64,296
|  

|-
| 1982
|  Don Pease (Incumbent): 92,296
| Timothy Paul Martin: 53,376
| James S. Patton: 5,053

|-
| 1984
|  Don Pease (Incumbent): 131,923
| William G. Schaffner: 59,610
| Other: 7,223

|-
| 1986
|  Don Pease (Incumbent): 88,612
| William D. Nielsen Jr.: 52,452
|  

|-
| 1988
|  Don Pease (Incumbent): 137,074
| Dwight Brown: 59,287
|  

|-
| 1990
|  Don Pease (Incumbent): 93,431
| William D. Nielsen Jr.: 60,925
| John Michael Ryan: 10,506

|-
| 1992
|  Sherrod Brown: 134,486
| Margaret R. Mueller: 88,889
| Mark Miller: 20,320Tom Lawson: 4,719Werner J. Lange: 3,844

|-
| 1994
|  Sherrod Brown (Incumbent): 93,147
| Gregory A. White: 86,422
| Howard Mason: 7,777John Michael Ryan: 2,430

|-
| 1996
|  Sherrod Brown (Incumbent): 148,690
| Kenneth C. Blair Jr.: 87,108
| David C. Kluter (N): 8,707

|-
| 1998
|  Sherrod Brown (Incumbent): 116,309
| Grace L. Drake: 72,666
|  

|-
| 2000
|  Sherrod Brown (Incumbent): 170,058
| Rick H. Jeric: 84,295
| Michael A. Chmura (L): 5,837David C. Kluter (N): 3,108

|-
| 2002
|  Sherrod Brown (Incumbent): 123,025
| Ed Oliveros: 55,357
|  

|-
| 2004
|  Sherrod Brown (Incumbent): 196,139
| Robert Lucas: 95,025
|  

|-
| 2006
|  Betty Sutton: 135,639
| Craig L. Foltin: 85,922
|  

|-
| 2008
|  Betty Sutton (Incumbent): 189,542
| David Potter: 104,066
| Robert Crow:  37  

|-
| 2010
|  Betty Sutton (Incumbent): 118,806
| Tom Ganley: 94,367
|  

|-
| 2012
|  Tim Ryan : 235,492
| Marisha Agana : 88,120
|  

|-
| 2014
|  Tim Ryan (Incumbent): 120,230
| Thomas Pekarek: 55,233
| David Allen Pastorius (write-in): 86

|-
| 2016
|  Tim Ryan (Incumbent): 208,610
| Richard A. Morckel: 99,377
| Calvin Hill Sr. (write-in): 17
|-
| 2018
|  Tim Ryan (Incumbent): 153,323	
| Chris DePizzo: 98,047	
| 
|-
| 2020
|  Tim Ryan (Incumbent): 173,631
| Christina Hagan: 148,648
| Michael Fricke: 8,522
|-
|2022
| Emilia Sykes: 149,816
|Madison Gesiotto Gilbert: 134,593
|
|}

 Recent election results from statewide races 

 Results Under Current Lines (Since 2023)''

Historical district boundaries

See also

Ohio's congressional districts
List of United States congressional districts

References

 Congressional Biographical Directory of the United States 1774–present

13
Constituencies established in 1823
1823 establishments in Ohio